26 September 2021

"Bodybuilders" was originally shot and aired in the year 2000 as an episode of the Discovery Channel documentary series called On the Inside.  This particular episode went into the sport of bodybuilding at the turn of the millennium, bringing light to various depths of bodybuilding that the general public had little awareness of at the time—particularly natural bodybuilding.  This episode aired for 8 years on 4 different networks. It inspired countless of thousands of people to achieve healthier greater physiques. Of all the bodybuilding documentaries, in terms of popularity, it comes second only to Pumping Iron, which was the documentary that turned Arnold Schwarzenegger into a household name. It also featured the former Incredible Hulk actor, Lou Ferrigno.

Cast
Internet Movie Data Base (IMDb) credited cast list: Arnold Schwarzenegger, Lesa Lewis, Lou Ferrigno, Frank Zane, Jay Cutler, Kim Chizevsky-Nicholls, Stan McQuay, Corinna Everson, Craig Titus, Joe Weider, Ben Weider, and Travis Wojcik.
 
Arnold Schwarzenegger
Corrina Everson
Lesa Lewis
Denise Hoshor
Yaxeni Oriquen-Garcia
Andrulla Blanchette
Yolanda Hughes-Heying
Kim Chizevsky-Nicholls
Valentina Chepiga
Renee Casella
Lora Ottenad
Joe Weider
Chad Nicholls
Craig Titus
Frank Zane
Jan Tana
Cynthia James
Iris Kyle
Jennifer McVicar
Th-resa Bostick
Ben Weider
Brenda Raganot
Ondrea Gates
James Manion
Wayne DeMilia
Travis Wojcik

References

External links
 IMDB
 YouTube
 IMDb: Pumping Iron

2000 in bodybuilding
Documentary films about bodybuilding
Documentary films about female bodybuilding
History of female bodybuilding